Glen Lake is a lake that is located north of Glens Falls, New York. Fish species present in the lake are rainbow trout, pickerel, smallmouth bass, largemouth bass, walleye, yellow perch, pumpkinseed sunfish, and brown bullhead. There is a carry down on the northwest shore off Glen Lake Road.

References

Lakes of New York (state)
Lakes of Warren County, New York